Mir Ahmad Bin Quasem Arman, also known as Mir Ahmad, is a Bangladeshi born British-trained barrister and human rights activist. He is a victim of enforced disappearance and is believed to have been abducted by security forces of the government of Bangladesh. He is the son of late Mir Quasem Ali, a prominent leader of the opposition Bangladesh Jamaat-e-Islami, and was a member of his father's legal defence team before his abduction.

According to a recent whistleblower report, it is believed that Mir Ahmad is currently being detained at a Bangladeshi secret detention center known as Aynaghar.

Education and Career 
He completed his Bar Vocational Course (BVC) from Inns of Court School of Law (ICSL) and was called to the Bar of England and Wales, becoming Barrister. He had completed his L.L.B (Hons.) from the University of London.

At the time of his abduction in 2016, Mir Ahmad was representing his father Mir Quasem Ali as part of the latter's defence team in the International Crimes Tribunal (ICT) of Bangladesh set up in 2010.

Abduction 
Mir Ahmad was reportedly snatched from in front of his family members at his house in Mirpur, Dhaka during the night on 9 August 2016.

According to a statement by Mir Ahmad's lawyers on the occasion of the third anniversary of his abduction, a group of 8 or 9 men entered Mir Ahmad's apartment at 11 pm on 9 August 2016, and demanded his whereabouts from his family.  Mir Ahmad then went to the door, when he was told that he had to come with them. He was given 5 minutes with his family after which the men stormed into the apartment, and Mir Ahmad was pulled and grabbed away from his family, and dragged down the stairs and out of the house. He was then placed in a mini-bus which was driven away. According to the statement by the lawyers, "this abduction followed the exact modus operandi of other abductions by the security forces in Bangladesh."

The same statement states that Mir Ahmad had been previously visited and questioned by several members of Rapid Action Battalion earlier on 5 August 2016.

Statements by Human Rights organisations 
Several international human rights organizations including Amnesty International and Human Rights Watch have reported on his abduction and called for his release. Amnesty has said that Mir Ahmad was "arrested without a warrant by men in plainclothes on 9 August. He has been held incommunicado ever since, and has not been charged with any crime."

Human Rights Watch, in a report, claimed that Mir Ahmad was abducted by men who said that they were "members of the administration," without specifying which part of the security forces they belonged to. Despite asking them to produce a warrant, the men dragged Mir Ahmed away, saying that they "did not need a[n arrest] warrant."

The UN Working Group on Enforced or Involuntary Disappearances urged the government of Bangladesh to "immediately reveal whereabouts ... of all victims of enforced disappearance in Bangladesh," including that of Mir Ahmad. In August 2021, Human Rights Watch released a 57-page report titled “‘Where No Sun Can Enter’: A Decade of Enforced Disappearances in Bangladesh,” where they noted that Mir Ahmad was among 86 victims of enforced disappearance in Bangladesh who were still missing.

News of Abduction in International Media 
On Al-Jazeera's Head to Head programme broadcast on 1 March 2019, Mir Ahmad's lawyer Michael Polak asked a question on Mir Ahmad's abduction case to Bangladeshi Foreign Affairs Advisor Mr Gowher Rizvi while the latter was being interviewed by show host Mehdi Hasan. Mr. Rizvi assured that investigations into all allegations of enforced disappearance   would be carried out, and that he would personally assist in Mir Ahmad's case.

Foreign Policy has reported on the abduction of Mir Ahmad while reporting on enforced disappearance in Bangladesh.

David Bergman, in an investigative report written for The Wire, has claimed that Mir Ahmad may have been abducted on direct orders of Bangladeshi Prime Minister Sheikh Hasina. Hasina is said to have given Bangladesh's military intelligence agency Directorate General of Forces Intelligence(DGFI) “clearance” to illegally pick up Mir Ahmad, as part of the government's widening crackdown on the country's opposition.

Mir Ahmad's case also made international headlines when Channel 4 news presenter Alex Thomson asked Hampstead and Kilburn MP Tulip Siddique, the niece of the Bangladeshi Prime Minister Sheikh Hasina, whether she would use her influence with the Bangladeshi government to help free Mir Ahmad in Bangladesh.

See also 

 Forced disappearance
 Forced disappearance in Bangladesh
 Human rights in Bangladesh
 Abdullahil Amaan Azmi
 Aynaghar

References 

Bangladeshi human rights activists
Enforced disappearances in Bangladesh
Bangladeshi barristers
Living people
Date of birth missing (living people)
Place of birth missing (living people)
Year of birth missing (living people)